"#1 Stunna" is the second official single by the Big Tymers, from their third studio album, I Got That Work. The single was featured in the 2000 stand-up comedy film, The Original Kings of Comedy, and its stars Steve Harvey, D.L. Hughley, and Cedric the Entertainer  appeared in the music video. In that same year, it placed at number 24, along with the other lead single, "Get Your Roll On", on the Billboard Hot R&B/Hip-Hop Singles & Tracks chart. "#1 Stunna" also contains verses from Juvenile and Lil Wayne.

Charts

References

External links
 Music video on ArtistDirect

2000 singles
Big Tymers songs
Cash Money Records singles
Juvenile (rapper) songs
Lil Wayne songs
Songs written by Lil Wayne
Song recordings produced by Mannie Fresh
Songs written by Juvenile (rapper)
2000 songs
Songs written by Birdman (rapper)